Six ships of the Royal Navy have borne the name HMS Fawn:

 HMS Fawn (1805), a 16-gun brig-corvette, originally the French ship Faune, that  captured in the English Channel in 1805 and that disappears from the records in 1806. 
 , an 18-gun sloop-of-war launched in 1807, sold in 1818; she then made seven whaling voyages from 1820 until she was broken up in 1844.
 , a 6-gun brigantine, originally the Portuguese slave ship Caroline purchased in 1840 at Rio de Janeiro, converted in 1842 to a tank (water) vessel, and sold in May 1847 to the Natal Provincial Government.
 , a 17-gun wood screw sloop-of-war launched in 1856, used as a survey ship from 1876 and sold in 1884
  was a Fawn-class destroyer launched in 1897 and sold in 1919
  was a Bulldog-class survey ship launched in 1968 and sold in 1991

Battle honours
Ships named Fawn have earned the following battle honours:
 Gabbard, 1653
 Martinique, 1809
 Guadeloupe, 1810
 Belgian Coast, 1914−18

Note

References

Royal Navy ship names